Nancy Scranton (born April 26, 1961) is an American professional golfer.

Scranton was born in Centralia, Illinois. She attended Florida State University and the University of Kentucky. Her rookie season on the LPGA Tour was 1985. She has three tournament victories on the tour, including one major championship, the 1991 du Maurier Classic. Her best money list finish was 16th in 1991. She was a member of the United States team at the 2000 Solheim Cup.

Professional wins

LPGA Tour wins (3)

LPGA Tour playoff record (1–0)

Futures Tour wins (1)
1984 Willow Creek Classic

Legends Tour wins (5)
2006 BJ's Charity Championship (with Christa Johnson)
2007 BJ's Charity Championship (with Christa Johnson)
2010 Women's Senior National Invitational
2012 LPGA Legends Swing for the Cure
2013 Walgreens Charity Championship

Major championships

Wins (1)

Team appearances
Professional
Solheim Cup (representing the United States): 2000
Handa Cup (representing the United States): 2007 (winners), 2009 (winners), 2010 (winners), 2011 (winners), 2012 (tie, Cup retained), 2013, 2014 (winners)

External links

American female golfers
Florida State Seminoles women's golfers
Kentucky Wildcats women's golfers
LPGA Tour golfers
Winners of LPGA major golf championships
Solheim Cup competitors for the United States
Golfers from Illinois
People from Centralia, Illinois
1961 births
Living people